The 1899 Washington Agricultural football team was an American football team that represented Washington Agricultural College during the 1899 college football season. The team competed as an independent under head coach Frank Shively and compiled a record of 1–1.

Schedule

References

Further reading
 Walter Camp (ed.), Foot Ball Rules as Recommended to the University Athletic Club by the Rules Committee. New York: American Sports Publishing Co., 1899.

Washington Agricultural
Washington State Cougars football seasons
Washington Agricultural football